UPF0739 protein C1orf74 is a protein that in humans is encoded by the C1orf74 gene.

Gene
The gene C1orf74 is a protein-encoding gene on chromosome 1 in humans.  It is also known as URLC4 in humans. The locus of this gene is 1q32.2. C1orf74 is 2229 base pairs long. The gene contains two exons.

C1orf74 is downstream of the gene interferon regulatory factor 6 or IRF6 in humans.

Transcript
C1orf74 is transcribed into an mRNA that is 1642 nucleotides long in humans.  The transcript contains two exons and one upstream in-frame stop codon. The 5' UTR of this transcript is 343 nucleotides long and the 3' UTR is 570 nucleotides long.

Both exons are usually transcribed. A few cases exist where only the second exon was transcribed. A fusion transcript containing IRF6 and the first exon of C1orf74 has also been found, but this transcript results in a short polypeptide.

Protein
The protein that is encoded by C1orf74 in humans is most commonly known as UPF0739 protein C1orf74. The human version of UPF0739 contains 269 amino acids and weighs 29430 Da. Amino acids 19 to 269 are part of a domain of unknown function known as DUF4504. Within this DUF, there are two conserved sequence motifs LLGYP and SFS.

The translational start site of C1orf74 is after the exon-exon junction, which means the protein is made only by translating the second exon.

Expression
C1orf74 is ubiquitously expressed in most tissues in humans during embryonic development and through adulthood. This gene is expressed throughout the nervous system, mammary and salivary glands, skin, and most internal organs.

Function 
One suggestion of C1orf74's function in humans comes from data that has been published only in NCBI from a paper that will come out later this year by Daigo and Nakamura. The authors found that C1orf74 is up-regulated in lung cancer and they have added the alias URLC4 to this protein (BAQ19750).

C1orf74's locus, 1q32.2, has been associated with schizophrenia. This means that C1orf74, or its neighbors, contribute to the risk of schizophrenia. A mutation in IRF6, C1orf74's upstream neighbor, results in cleft palate and Van der Woude syndrome.  Mutations in regions upstream and downstream of IRF6, such as C1orf74, may also result in Van der Woude syndrome or these mutations may work with a mutation in IRF6 to result in the disease.

Evolution
The human gene C1orf74 does not have any known paralogs, but it has many orthologs that contain the same DUF. It has orthologs in most vertebrates and some invertebrates, like worms, leeches and sea snails.  Some of C1orf74's orthologs include mouse, hedgehog, chicken, zebrafish, alligator, and leech. C1orf74 has a distant ortholog in white rust (Albugo candida), which is a type of oomycete and not a true fungus. No orthologs were found in plants, fungi, or bacteria.

References 

Human proteins
Uncharacterized proteins
Genes on human chromosome 1